Myron Bennett "Pinky" Thompson (February 29, 1924 - December 25, 2001) was a social worker and community leader in Hawaii and a cultural leader among the Native Hawaiians. He is best known for his work as a member of the Board of Trustees of Bishop Estate (now known as Kamehameha Schools).

Thompson graduated from Punahou School in 1943 and received a bachelor's degree in sociology from Colby College in 1950 and a master's degree in social work from the University of Hawaiʻi at Mānoa in 1952.

His community leadership posts include:
Executive director of the Queen Liliuokalani Children's Center (1962 - 1967)
State administrator under Gov. John A. Burns (1967 - 1970)
Executive director of the Hawaii State Department of Social Services & Housing (1970 - 1974)
Trustee of Bishop Estate (1974 - 1994).  In this capacity he developed early childhood programs, the cancellation of which in the late 1990s led to a controversy that sparked major changes in the trust.
Co-founder, Alu Like and Papa Ola Lokahi (Native Hawaiian Health Care System)
President of the Polynesian Voyaging Society (1979 - 2001).

Thompson is the father of master wayfinder Nainoa Thompson, who made several trans-Polynesian voyages as the navigator of the canoes Hokulea and Hawaiiloa. The younger Thompson now leads the Polynesian Voyaging Society and sits on the Board of Trustees of Kamehameha Schools.

References

External links
Obituary on Pinky Thompson, Honolulu Advertiser
Obituary on Pinky Thompson, Honolulu Star-Bulletin
Profile on Pinky Thompson from the Polynesian Voyaging Society

1924 births
2001 deaths
Punahou School alumni
University of Hawaiʻi alumni
Colby College alumni